Mesquitol is a flavan-3-ol, a type of flavonoid.

Prosopis juliflora, an invasive New World mesquite now found in Kenya, has unusually high levels of (-)-mesquitol in its heartwood.

Mesquitol, with its pyrogallol-type A-ring, is more susceptible to quinone formation at this ring, leading to aryl–aryl bond formation at carbon 5. The structural moieties constitute the proteracacinidin class of proanthocyanidins. Mesquitol-(5→8)-catechin atropisomers can be isolated
from Prosopis glandulosa.

References 

Flavanols
Catechols